McCarty is an unincorporated community in Pemiscot County, in the U.S. state of Missouri.

History
McCarty has the name of Judge Sterling H. McCarty, who held a number of county offices. The community once had the McCarty School, now defunct.

References

Unincorporated communities in Pemiscot County, Missouri
Unincorporated communities in Missouri